The Carol Shields Prize for Fiction is a North American literary award, created in 2020 to honour literature by women. The annual prize will award $150,000 to the winning work and $12,500 to each of the shortlisted finalists, making it one of the world's richest literary awards. 

The prize will be open to both Canadian and American women and non-binary writers in English. French-language literature by Canadians, and Spanish-language literature by Americans, will be eligible when published in an English translation. Submissions will be judged by a jury that includes one Canadian, one American and one international judge. Novelist Carol Shields was selected as the namesake of the award, both in honour of her record as an advocate and mentor for women writers and because of her status as a dual citizen of both countries. The winner will also receive a residency at the Fogo Island writers' retreat, while the runners-up will receive residencies at Canadian or American universities. In addition, the winner will also select an emerging female or non-binary writer, who will receive a year-long mentorship. 

The prize was created by Canadian novelist Susan Swan and editor Janice Zawerbny, with an organizing committee that includes noted women literary figures such as Alice Munro, Dionne Brand, Jane Urquhart, Charlotte Gray, Margaret Atwood, Marie-Claire Blais, Natasha Trethewey, Jane Smiley, Francine Prose and Erica Jong. Alexandra Skoczylas is the current executive director. 

The award will be presented for the first time in 2023, with the longlist announced on March 8, the shortlist on April 6 and the winner on May 4.

Nominees and winners

References

Canadian fiction awards
American fiction awards
Literary awards honoring women
Awards established in 2020